A straw maze is a maze built with straw bales. These are becoming a popular tourist attraction in the Western United States, particularly in Rexburg, Idaho and a few locations in Utah.

One early straw maze was Pumpkins and More in Maryland.

There are many different straw mazes through the United States including: The Straw Maze in Idaho and Pumpkins and More in Maryland.

See also 
 Hedge maze
 Corn maze

Reference List

Mazes
Farms